New Old Friends is the third album by the indie rock band Dolour. It was produced by Shane Tutmarc.  It was mixed by Jason Holstrom and Shane Tutmarc.

Track listing
“I Smell a Lawsuit”
“You Can't Make New Old Friends”
“Cheer Up Baby”
“Next 2 U”
“Butter Knife Suicide”
“Before Tonight's Big Party”
“CPR”
“Behind the Melody”
“What If?”
“Candy”
“My Paranoid Mind”
“Running Forever”
“October 29th”

Recording details
The songs on the album were initially demos that Tutmarc made for Suburbiac's producer Aaron Sprinkle to comment on for a follow-up on Fugitive Records. Fugitive ceased operating and Tutmarc wrote songs about his growing dislike of the music business, including, "I Smell A Lawsuit" and "Cheer Up Baby"  "My Paranoid Mind," "What If", and "Behind the Melody" (sung by Jason Holstrom).

Release details
New Old Friends was released independently in February 2004, with different artwork, showing Tutmarc and a few of the contributing musicians in a collage-style.  The album was eventually picked up by Damien Jurado's Seattle indie label Made In Mexico Records and rereleased in November 2004 with a new layout and artwork by Shane's brother, Brandon Tutmarc.  The album was favorably reviewed by The Seattle Times, The Stranger, KEXP, and AllMusic.com.

New Old Friends tour
Tutmarc and band (including future Fleet Foxes leader Robin Pecknold on bass), undertook their first US tour in Spring 2005.

Musicians
 Craig Curran - bass
 Jason Holstrom - saxophone, ukulele, vocals
 Eric Howk - lead and rhythm guitar
 Sugar McGuinn - bass, percussion
 Paul Mumaw - drums on "You Can't Make New Old Friends," "Next 2 U," "Candy," and "October 29th"
 Phil Peterson - cello, string bass, trumpet, violin, synth, vocals, etc.
 Jon E Rock - percussion
 Joey Sanchez - drums on "I Smell A Lawsuit" and "Butter Knife Suicide"
 Jesse Sprinkle - drums on "Cheer Up Baby" and "CPR"
 Shane Tutmarc - vocals, piano, guitar, synth, bass, programming, percussion, etc.
 Noah Weaver - piano

Multiple releases
New Old Friends was originally self-released on February 17, 2004 with different album artwork by Brandon Tutmarc.

2004 albums
Dolour albums